Villiam Nieminen (29 February 1888 – 13 April 1972) was a Finnish gymnast. He competed in the men's artistic individual all-around event at the 1912 Summer Olympics.

References

1888 births
1972 deaths
Finnish male artistic gymnasts
Olympic gymnasts of Finland
Gymnasts at the 1912 Summer Olympics
Sportspeople from Tampere